Caitlin Plays Herself is a 2011 American drama film directed and produced by Joe Swanberg, written by Caitlin Stainken and Swanberg, and starring Stainken and Swanberg.  Swanberg and Stainken, a performance artist with the Neo-Futurists, play fictionalized versions of themselves.

Plot 
Caitlin, a socially-conscious performance artist, encounters difficulties when her boyfriend, Joe, objects to the nudity in her art.

Cast 
 Caitlin Stainken as Caitlin
 Joe Swanberg as Joe
 Frank V. Ross as Frank
 Spencer Parsons as Spencer
 Megan Mercier as Megan
 Kurt Chiang as Kurt
 Tim Reid as Tim
 Adam Wingard

Release 
Caitlin Plays Herself premiered at the New Horizons Film Festival in Wrocław, Poland, on July 18, 2011.  Its North American premiere was in Brooklyn, New York, on December 2, 2011.

Reception 
Rotten Tomatoes has cataloged three negative reviews and one positive. Ronnie Scheib of Variety called it "an American Vivre sa vie without the passion, drama or gorgeous imagery".  Paul Brunick of The New York Times wrote that Swanberg's biggest talent is his ability to get actresses to strip naked.  Nick Pinkerton of The Village Voice wrote, "It is possible that one of Swanberg’s movies is not a complete waste of time, but Caitlin Plays Herself, written in collaboration with its starlet, Caitlin Stainkin, is not the one."  Jaime N. Christley of Slant Magazine rated it 3/4 stars and compared it to Tsai Ming-liang's What Time Is It There?.

References

External links 
 
 

2011 films
2011 drama films
American drama films
Films directed by Joe Swanberg
Mumblecore films
2010s English-language films
2010s American films